The Neon Nature Tour is the third concert tour by Welsh recording artist Marina (formerly known as Marina and the Diamonds) in support of her third studio album, Froot (2015). The tour was officially announced three months after the release of the album, on June 23, 2015. The tour began on October 12, 2015, in Houston, Texas at the Revention Music Center and concluded on March 20, 2016, in Santiago, Chile, with a total of fifty-two shows over six months.

Background
After the release of Froot, Diamandis embarked on a promotional concert tour that was mostly composed of festival performances during the spring and summer of 2015. During the series of promotional concerts, Diamandis expressed an interest in doing a formal concert tour in the fall of that year. In April 2015, when speaking about the tour, Diamandis said "I think I’m calling my tour the Neon Nature tour. Creating this cyber garden on-stage, something exotic, but electrical."

Two months after the initial idea was expressed, on June 23, 2015, the tour's North American leg was officially announced with nineteen dates over two months. About two weeks after the tour's initial announcement, on July 6, 2015, the tour's European leg was announced with ten dates across the United Kingdom and Ireland. As the tour began to develop, additional dates were added to both legs of the tour.

On April 5, 2016, Diamandis posted a picture to Instagram following the conclusion of her tour, along with a statement on Twitter, marking the end of the Froot era, with Weeds being the only track on the album never performed live in the entirety of the Froot era and her career.

Development
In the months leading up to the tour, Diamandis began to tease what the tour's visual concept and theme would be. In an interview, Diamandis stated, "With the Neon Nature Tour, I really like the idea of taking natural things and blending them. I feel like it's something I’m always interested in anyway, and I feel like it's also something a lot of people connect to, like, 'How can you live a life that's natural while still progressing and being part of the technological world.' So the themes for Neon Nature involve a lot of flowers, fruit, very surreal elements … but it's definitely the biggest kind of tour I’ve ever done production-wise. I want to see what people think." She also revealed how the setlist would be structured as well as what type of merchandise will be for sale on the tour. When speaking of the setlist for the tour, Diamandis stated, "I have three acts in the show. My first act is devoted to my first album (The Family Jewels), the second is my second album, and the third is Froot. It's something I’ve wanted to do for a while. Each era has such a defined look that it didn’t make sense for me to mix them. I quite like theatre, and this is a theatrical show. It felt good to put it into three acts. I don’t think that often happens in alternative shows." When discussing what the merchandise stand would consist of, Diamandis exclaimed, "Well, I plan to go one up from what I’ve done in the past. I really want to do scratch and sniff T-shirts. Maybe those Global Hypercolor ones. I want to put my colour palette onto eye shadows and nail varnish. I also want glow in the dark T-shirts that people can buy and then be part of the show."

Concert synopsis
 
The show is split into three acts, each one devoted to an album by Diamandis, beginning with "The Family Jewels". During most, but not all, shows, the show is performed on a double stage, comprising the venue's original stage floor and a balcony-style stage above three video screens. 
The show's opener, "Mowgli's Road" is performed. While during most of the United Kingdom and North American leg of the tour, Diamandis enters wearing either one of two outfits designed by Paula Knorr, featuring headbands with two jewels on them. During the European and South American leg of the tour, some of the shows started with Diamandis entering and performing "Mowgli's Road" in an outfit designed by Celia Kritharioti. The show continues with "I Am Not a Robot" and "Oh No!"; Diamandis briefly talks to the audience and moves to a keyboard to perform "Obsessions" while the video screens display footage from Betty Boop shorts. This section closes with a performance of "Hollywood" amid scenes of animated Hollywood. Diamandis leaves the stage for a costume change.

Opening the next section, a remixed version of "Electra Heart" is played by the band alongside a video interlude where Diamandis' face is seen flowing to her signature Electra Heart look while the album's title flashes. While an interlude of "Bubblegum Bitch" is played, a silhouette of Diamandis appears on the screens, and Diamandis enters with pompoms and the signature heart on her left cheek. At most of the concerts, Diamandis enters wearing a pink catsuit designed by Austin Louis Perry, while some of the other concerts she is seen wearing an outfit also designed by Austin Louis Perry with a pink catsuit and holographic bell bottoms on her arms and legs. She begins to perform an energetic performance of "Bubblegum Bitch" with the video screens displaying various phrases such as "Tweet Me", "Marry Me", "Cwtch Me" ("cwtch" is Welsh for "cuddle" or "hug"), "Miracles Happen". After the first chorus, she throws the pompoms back in a sassy manner. The next number played was "Teen Idle". In 2016, the graphics changed with phrases that say "Welcome to the life of Electra Heart" and "Marilyn is the only one who understands" (Earlier in the tour, "Radioactive" was performed instead of "Teen Idle"). This is followed by "How to Be a Heartbreaker". "Primadonna" is performed after Diamandis re-introduces the robotic poodle "Marilyn", who also made an appearance in the majority of "The Lonely Hearts Club Tour". The section closes with a performance of "Lies" where lights start flashing around the stage, and Diamandis exits for another costume change. 

The next section opens with a video interlude displaying Diamandis' Electra Heart look transforming to her face as seen in the cover of "Froot", with a starry background and various fruits as well as the album's name flashing on the screen. Diamandis re-appears above the video screens. and at most concerts, wearing a sparkly blue catsuit with similar colored cape attached and similar colored cherries used as a head accessory, with the outfit designed by Michael Costello and the headpiece by Piers Atkinson. Other outfits were such as a green catsuit with bell bottom "sleeves" and a blue catsuit with fabric flowing from the sleeves, both designed by Burnt Soul. She begins to perform "Froot"; following this she moves to the lower stage and performs "Savages", "Can't Pin Me Down" and "I'm A Ruin" (From December 1 to 3, 2015, "Gold"; And at some shows "Solitaire" was performed). "Forget" is performed next (At some shows, "True Colours", a Cyndi Lauper cover song was performed after "Forget"), then "Immortal", where home video footage is seen on the screens. After briefly leaving the stage, Diamandis begins the encore by performing "Happy" against a starry background; the show ends with a performance of "Blue" with snippets of the music video playing on the screens. Diamandis then thanks the audience for coming, introduces her band members, takes one final bow with her band and exits the stage.

Critical reception
The tour was well-received by fans and critics and got positive reviews. Frank Mojica from the Chicago-based online magazine Consequence of Sound praised the 19 October 2015 show in Los Angeles at the Greek Theatre, calling it "A pop experience that's all pleasure and no guilt". Reviewing the 23 November Manchester concert at The Ritz, Annaliese Watkins from the Manchester Evening News gave a positive review, saying: "As always, the show was cartoonish and flashy in its production, a trait which fails to distract from Marina's incredible vocals, glorious glam-rock get-ups and ever-surprising lyrics"

Broadcast
The performance on November 4, 2015 in Boston was live-streamed by Yahoo, and the show on March 12, 2016 at Lollapalooza Brasil was streamed through Internet Worldwide and TV in Brazil. On November 11, 2015 Diamandis performed an exclusive and intimate Neon Nature Tour show at the New York Hall of Science which was recorded for an episode of the Live from the Artists Den TV series. The episode was aired through television on April 24, 2016.

Set list
This setlist is representative of the show on February 25, 2016. It does not represent all dates throughout the tour.

Act 1: The Family Jewels
"Mowgli's Road"
"I Am Not a Robot"
"Oh No!"
"Obsessions"
"Hollywood"
Act 2: Electra Heart
"Bubblegum Bitch"
"Teen Idle"
"How to Be a Heartbreaker"
"Primadonna"
"Lies"
Act 3: Froot
"Froot"
"Savages"
"Can't Pin Me Down"
"I'm a Ruin"
"Forget"
"Immortal"
Encore
"Happy"
"Blue"

Shows

Notes

References

Marina Diamandis concert tours
2015 concert tours
2016 concert tours
Concert tours of Canada
Concert tours of Europe
Concert tours of France
Concert tours of Germany
Concert tours of Ireland
Concert tours of North America
Concert tours of South America
Concert tours of the United Kingdom
Concert tours of the United States